Ricardo Silva Romero (born 1975) is a Colombian writer, journalist, screenwriter and film critic. He is the author of over a dozen books in a variety of genres. In 2007, he was named as one of the Bogota39, a list of best young writers in Latin America.

References

Colombian writers